Blasdead is a Japanese heavy metal band from Yokohama formed in 1990.

History 
Blasdead was formed in Yokohama in 1990. After a series of demo tapes, the band released its first album, Another Dimension',' on Lard Records in 1996. Officially, the band has released four studio albums, the most recent being The Phoenix Never Dies, which was released in 2015 on Black-listed Records.

Since its formation, the guitarist Shoji Yasuno has been the only constant member.

 Members 
 Current members 
 Shoji Yasuno - guitar (1990–present)
 Takashi Yano - drums (2002–present)
 Kentaro Sasagawa - bass guitar (2009–present)
 Kaoru "Hammy" Iihama - vocals (2012–present)

 Past members 
 Mitsuhiro Kondou - bass guitar (1990-1994)
 Masaru Azekura - drums (1990-1994)
 Yoshiyuki Suzuki - vocals (1990-1994)
 Yoshio Enari - bass guitar (1995-2007)
 Tatsuya Takeyari - drums (1995-2002)
 Jeff Rowe - vocals (1995-1996)
 Shuji Izaki - vocals (1998-1999, 2007-2011)
 Yasuyuki "Chappy" Kida - vocals (1999-2000)
 Eiji Yokoyama - vocals (2000-2007)
 Minoru Itabashi - bass guitar (2007-2009)
 Takashi Satou - guitar (2012-2016)

 Discography 
 Demo 1992
 Demo 1993
 Try Your Faith (demo, 1995)
 Another Dimension (1996, Lard)
 Mechanical Civilization EP (2001, self-released)
 Ground Flare (2006, Black-listed)
 The Past and The Future (2010, Black-listed)
 The Phoenix Never Dies'' (2015, Black-listed)

References

External links 
Official website
Twitter

Japanese power metal musical groups
Japanese speed metal musical groups
Musical groups established in 1990